Bayan (Airport) station is a station on Line 1 of the Hohhot Metro and opened on 29 December 2019. It serves the nearby Hohhot Baita International Airport and Bayan Village, and is the eastern terminus of the line.

References

Hohhot Metro stations
Railway stations in China opened in 2019